Natalya Ivanova Baranova-Masalkina; born February 25, 1975, in Krivosheino, Tomsk Oblast) is a former Russian cross-country skier who has competed from 1994 to 2006. She won a gold medal in the 4 × 5 km relay at the 2006 Winter Olympics in Turin.

Baranova-Masalkina won two medals at the 2005 FIS Nordic World Ski Championships with a silver in the 4 × 5 km relay and a bronze in the 30 km. She also has three individual victories at various levels from 1995 to 2004.

Doping case 
Baranova-Masalkina tested positive for EPO in a WADA pre-Games control for the 2002 Winter Olympics. She was ejected from the Olympic village after the positive was announced, and was subsequently handed a two-year ban from sports by the International Ski Federation.

Cross-country skiing results
All results are sourced from the International Ski Federation (FIS).

Olympic Games
 1 medal – (1 gold)

World Championships
 2 medals – (1 silver, 1 bronze)

World Cup

Season standings

Individual podiums
3 podiums

Team podiums
 4 victories 
 14 podiums

References

External links
 
 
 

1975 births
Living people
Doping cases in cross-country skiing
Russian sportspeople in doping cases
People from Tomsk Oblast
Russian female cross-country skiers
Olympic gold medalists for Russia
Cross-country skiers at the 2006 Winter Olympics
Olympic cross-country skiers of Russia
Olympic medalists in cross-country skiing
FIS Nordic World Ski Championships medalists in cross-country skiing
Medalists at the 2006 Winter Olympics
Tomsk State Pedagogical University alumni
Academic staff of Tomsk State Pedagogical University
21st-century Russian women